is a male Japanese animation director. He is also known under the name  (meaning "forest fairy" in Japanese).

Anime involved in

Under the name Shigenori Kageyama
 Acrobunch: Character Design
 Birth: Animation Coordination, Main Animator
 Dōkyūsei 2: Screenplay
 Dynamic Chord: Director, Series Composition, Script (eps. 1–4), Storyboard (eps. 1–12)
 Himawari!: Director
 Himawari!!: Director
 The Humanoid: Editorial Supervisor
 I"s: Script
 Kakyuusei: Storyboard (ep 7)
 Kakyuusei 2: Screenplay, Series construction
 Kaze no Yojimbo: Storyboard
 Leda: The Fantastic Adventure of Yohko: Animation Coordination, Main Animator
 Mask of Zeguy: Director, Screenplay
 My Clueless First Friend: Director
 Naruto: Storyboard
 Once Upon a Time Windaria: Animation Coordination, Key Animation
 Pia Carrot 2 DX: Screenplay
 Plawres Sanshiro: Animation director
 Saber Rider and the Star Sheriffs: Animation director
 Space Warrior Baldios: Illustration
 Urotsukidoji IV: Inferno Road: Director (ep. 3)
 Yamato 2520: Director (ep. 3), Storyboard

Under the name Yōsei Morino
 Dōkyūsei 2: Director
 I"s: Director
 Kakyuusei: Storyboard (ep 3)
 Kakyuusei 2: Director
 Midnight Panther: Director, Screenplay, Storyboard
 My Sexual Harassment: Director
 One: Kagayaku Kisetsu e: Director
 Pia Carrot 2: Screenplay
 Pia Carrot 2 DX: Director
 Queen's Blade Rebellion: Director, Script (ep 12), Storyboard (eps. 1, 3, 5-7, 12), Episode Director
 Romance is in the Flash of the Sword II: Director, Script
 With You ~Mitsumeteitai~: Director
 Words Worth: Screenplay, Storyboard (ep 3)
 Words Worth: Outer Story'': Screenplay, Storyboard

References

External links
 

Anime directors
Japanese theatre directors
Living people
Year of birth missing (living people)